The Foudroyant was a first-rate ship of the line of the French Royal Navy, designed by Hélie.

Foudroyant never took to sea, and was broken up between 1742 and 1743.

References
 Dictionnaire de la flotte de guerre française, Jean-Michel Roche

Ships of the line of the French Navy
1720s ships